The Brantford Motts Clamatos were a Canadian senior ice hockey team in the Ontario Hockey Association's Senior A Hockey League, from Brantford, Ontario.  The team played their games at the Brantford Civic Centre in the 1980s.  The Brantford Motts Clamatos, sponsored by the Mott's company, which produced a drink called Clamato, won the Allan Cup, the top tier Canadian senior ice hockey league in the province of Ontario, in 1987.

Championships
Brantford won the J. Ross Robertson Cup as league champions during the 1986–87 season.

1986–87 – Allan Cup Champions
 at Brantford, Brantford Motts Clamatos defeat the Nelson Maple Leafs  4-0
 Friday April 24 – Nelson Maple Leafs 5 at Brantford Motts Clamatos 10
 Saturday April 25 – Nelson Maple Leafs 1 at Brantford Motts Clamatos 5
 Sunday April 26 – Nelson Maple Leafs 3 at Brantford Motts Clamatos 6
 Monday April 27 – Nelson Maple Leafs 6 at Brantford Motts Clamatos 7 (double overtime)

1986–87 – Bolton Cup Champions
 at Brantford, Brantford Motts Clamatos defeat the St. John's Caps 4-2
Monday April 13 - St. John's Caps 4 at Brantford Motts Clamatos 8
Wednesday April 15 - St. John's Caps 2 at Brantford Motts Clamatos 4
Thursday April 16 - St. John's Caps 2 at Brantford Motts Clamatos 3 (double overtime)

References

Ice hockey teams in Ontario
Senior ice hockey teams
Sport in Brantford